Jack Connor (7 September 1911 – 1994) was a Scottish footballer who played as a centre forward.

He began his career with St Roch's and joined Celtic in 1932. He was then loaned to Airdrie, where he scored 22 league goals. He joined the club permanently the following season after being unable to break into the first team at Celtic Park and continued to score regularly, including six goals in eight matches during a brief loan spell with Albion Rovers. He moved to England in 1936 to play for Plymouth Argyle. He scored 17 goals in his first season with the club, but lost his place in the team the following year after the arrival of Bill Hullett. He was transferred to Swansea Town and spent one season with the Welsh side before joining Queen of the South, where he played during the Second World War. He briefly played for Alloa Athletic and St Johnstone after the war before returning to St Roch's as their manager.

References

1911 births
1994 deaths
Footballers from Glasgow
Scottish footballers
Association football forwards
Celtic F.C. players
Airdrieonians F.C. (1878) players
Albion Rovers F.C. players
Plymouth Argyle F.C. players
Swansea City A.F.C. players
Queen of the South F.C. players
Alloa Athletic F.C. players
St Johnstone F.C. players
Scottish Football League players
English Football League players
St Roch's F.C. players